The canton of Serris is an administrative division of the Seine-et-Marne department, in northern France. It was created at the French canton reorganisation which came into effect in March 2015. Its seat is in Serris.

It consists of the following communes: 

Bailly-Romainvilliers 
Bouleurs
Boutigny
Chessy
Condé-Sainte-Libiaire
Couilly-Pont-aux-Dames
Coulommes
Coupvray
Coutevroult
Crécy-la-Chapelle
Esbly
La Haute-Maison
Magny-le-Hongre
Montry
Quincy-Voisins
Saint-Fiacre
Saint-Germain-sur-Morin 
Sancy
Serris
Tigeaux
Vaucourtois
Villemareuil
Villiers-sur-Morin
Voulangis

References

Cantons of Seine-et-Marne